La Carabassa is a mountain of Catalonia, Spain. Located in the Pyrenees, it has an altitude of 2736 metres above sea level.

See also
Mountains of Catalonia

References

Mountains of Catalonia
Mountains of the Pyrenees
Two-thousanders of Spain